A disintegrin and metalloproteinase with thrombospondin motifs 1 is an enzyme that in humans is encoded by the ADAMTS1 gene.

Function 

This gene encodes a member of the ADAMTS (a disintegrin and metalloproteinase with thrombospondin motif) protein family. Members of the family share several distinct protein modules, including a propeptide region, a metalloproteinase domain, a disintegrin-like domain, and a thrombospondin type 1 (TS) motif. Individual members of this family differ in the number of C-terminal TS motifs, and some have unique C-terminal domains. The protein encoded by this gene contains two disintegrin loops and three C-terminal TS motifs and has anti-angiogenic activity. The expression of this gene may be associated with various inflammatory processes as well as development of cancer cachexia. This gene is likely to be necessary for normal growth, fertility, and organ morphology and function.

Interactions 

ADAMTS1 has been shown to interact with Vascular endothelial growth factor A.

References

Further reading

External links
 The MEROPS online database for peptidases and their inhibitors: M12.222
 ADAMTS1 on the Atlas of Genetics and Oncology
 
 

ADAMTS